A monochrome or red rainbow is an optical and meteorological phenomenon and a rare variation of the more commonly seen multicolored rainbow. Its formation process is identical to that of a normal rainbow (namely the reflection/refraction of light in water droplets), the difference being that a monochrome rainbow requires the sun to be close to the horizon; i.e., near sunrise or sunset. The low angle of the sun results in a longer distance for its light to travel through the atmosphere, causing shorter wavelengths of light, such as blue, green and yellow, to be scattered and leaving primarily red.
In the lower light environment where the phenomenon most often forms, a monochrome rainbow can leave a highly dramatic effect.

References

Further reading

Atmospheric optical phenomena
Rainbow